Albert E. Cowdrey (born December 8, 1933 in New Orleans, Louisiana - died August 21, 2022) was an American author who wrote nonfictional historical studies and fantasy and science fiction literature. He was educated in Tulane and Johns Hopkins universities and worked for twenty-five years as a military historian, mostly in and around Washington, D.C. As a Chief of the Special History Branch in the U.S. Army, he wrote a number of books about the history of the medical branches of the army. He published the science fiction novel Crux and more than fifty short stories. Much of his short fiction has appeared in Fantasy and Science Fiction and centered on his love for New Orleans, where he was born and raised. He is the only writer to receive awards from both, the American Historical Association and the World Fantasy Convention.

In 2003 Cowdrey's short story "Queen for a Day" won the World Fantasy Award. His novella "The Overseer" received a nomination in the 2009 World Fantasy Awards. His novella "The Tribes of Bela" was a finalist for the 2005 Nebula Award.

Bibliography

Short fiction 
Stories

The Familiar, (ss) F&SF Mar 1997
White Magic, (nv) F&SF Mar 1998
The Great Ancestor, (ss) F&SF Sep 1998
Revenge, (ss) F&SF May 1999
Tomorrow, (ss) F&SF Jun 2001
Queen for a Day, (nv) F&SF Oct/Nov 2001
Ransom [Crux], (na) F&SF Mar 2002
The Posthumous Man, (ss) F&SF Jul 2002
The Boy’s Got Talent, (nv) F&SF Sep 2002
Grey Star, (ss) F&SF Jan 2003
The Dog Movie, (ss) F&SF Apr 2003
Danny’s Inferno, (ss) F&SF Dec 2003
Rapper, (ss) F&SF Feb 2004
Silent Echoes, (nv) F&SF Apr 2004
A Balance of Terrors, (ss) F&SF Jul 2004
The Tribes of Bela, (na) F&SF Aug 2004
The Name of the Sphinx, (nv) F&SF Dec 2004
The Amulet, (nv) F&SF Mar 2005
Twilight States, (ss) F&SF Jul 2005
The Housewarming, (ss) F&SF Sep 2005
The Revivalist, (na) F&SF Mar 2006
Imitation of Life, (ss) F&SF May 2006
Animal Magnetism, (nv) F&SF Jun 2006
Immortal Forms, (ss) F&SF Aug 2006
Revelation, (ss) F&SF Oct/Nov 2006
Murder in the Flying Vatican, (na) F&SF Aug 2007
Envoy Extraordinary , (ss) F&SF Sep 2007
The Recreation Room, (nv) F&SF Oct/Nov 2007
The Overseer, (na) F&SF March 2008
Thrilling Wonder Stories, (ss) F&SF May 2008
Poison Victory, (nv) F&SF July 2008
A Skeptical Spirit, (nv) F&SF Dec 2008
Seafarer's Blood, (nv) F&SF Jan 2009
The Visionaries, (ss) F&SF Jan/Feb 2016
The Legacy, (nv) F&SF July/Aug 2019
This Land, This South: An Environmental History 1983

References

External links
 Bluejack entry - Site with partial bibliography and biographical details.

 Albert E. Cowdrey obituary

21st-century American novelists
21st-century American short story writers
American fantasy writers
21st-century American historians
American male novelists
American male short story writers
The Magazine of Fantasy & Science Fiction people
World Fantasy Award-winning writers
Writers from New Orleans
21st-century American male writers
Novelists from Louisiana
American male non-fiction writers
1933 births
Historians from Louisiana